Gurulawela South Grama Niladhari Division is a Grama Niladhari Division of the Ukuwela Divisional Secretariat of Matale District of Central Province, Sri Lanka. It has Grama Niladhari Division Code E358A.

Paragahawela, Maberiya, Gurukete, Nitulgahakotuwa and Manaboda are located within, nearby or associated with Gurulawela South.

Gurulawela South is a surrounded by the Marukona, Kandemada, Nugapitiya, Ukuwela, Ulpathapitiya, Bowatta, Manaboda and Gurulawela North Grama Niladhari Divisions.

Demographics

Ethnicity 
The Gurulawela South Grama Niladhari Division has a Sinhalese majority (96.9%). In comparison, the Ukuwela Divisional Secretariat (which contains the Gurulawela South Grama Niladhari Division) has a Sinhalese majority (64.8%) and a significant Moor population (20.5%)

Religion 
The Gurulawela South Grama Niladhari Division has a Buddhist majority (96.7%). In comparison, the Ukuwela Divisional Secretariat (which contains the Gurulawela South Grama Niladhari Division) has a Buddhist majority (64.3%), a significant Muslim population (20.8%) and a significant Hindu population (13.1%)

References 

Grama Niladhari Divisions of Ukuwela Divisional Secretariat